Edward K. Archer (born May 16, 1972), known professionally as Special Ed, is an American rapper and producer. Ed is perhaps best known for the songs "I Got It Made", "Think About It" and "I'm the Magnificent" from his debut album Youngest in Charge, released in 1989 when he was 17 years old.

Biography
Born in Brooklyn, New York City to an Afro-Jamaican father and Indo-Jamaican mother, Ed was raised in Flatbush before moving to Canarsie, and is identified with east coast hip-hop. Ed attended Erasmus Hall High School and Samuel J. Tilden High School. At the age of fifteen, he established a rapport with his neighbor Howie Tee, who worked with him on his demo. Ed's debut album Youngest in Charge was released in 1989 and included the songs "I Got It Made", "Think About It" and "I'm The Magnificent", which were produced by "Hitman" Howie Tee. In an interview with Billboard (magazine) writer James Richliano, Special Ed, who co-wrote his songs, said that he, "used to like writing poetry and creative writing in school," and that he, "wrote a lot of lyrics that amused my teachers. Even when I was younger, I could kick a beat with my hands and rhyme at the same time."

Youngest in Charge sold more than half a million copies. In 1990, Ed released his album Legal, the title a reference to his turning eighteen, with the singles "Come On Let's Move It" and "The Mission". Ed was later a member of Crooklyn Dodgers, a supergroup put together in order to perform songs for the Spike Lee films Clockers and Crooklyn, and he performed "Crooklyn" with Shillz on the 2003 compilation album MuskaBeatz. Ed released a third solo album, Revelations, with the single "Neva Go Back" in 1995, with the track "Freaky Flow" receiving a remix by DJ Premier.

In 2004, Ed released the album Still Got It Made on his own label "Semi." Ed appeared in the film Ganked, alongside Kel Mitchell of Kenan and Kel, and had an uncredited cameo in Juice. He also made an appearance on The Cosby Show as fictional rapper JT Freeze and in a Rick Ross music video entitled "Magnificent". He also appeared in the 1992 movie Fly By Night.

Discography

Studio albums

Compilation albums

As lead artist

References

Notes

Citations

External links

Special Ed Myspace

1972 births
African-American male rappers
American rappers of Jamaican descent
Living people
Profile Records artists
Rappers from Brooklyn
Erasmus Hall High School alumni
People from Flatbush, Brooklyn
21st-century American rappers
21st-century American male musicians
People from Canarsie, Brooklyn
21st-century African-American musicians
20th-century African-American people
Crooklyn Dodgers members